The 1976 UCLA Bruins football team represented the University of California, Los Angeles during the 1976 NCAA Division I football season. Ranked at 17th in the pre-season AP Poll, former UCLA player Terry Donahue took over as the head coach. The Bruins were 9–2–1 for the season and second in the Pacific-8 Conference. UCLA lost 36–6 in the Liberty Bowl to Alabama.

Schedule

Personnel

Game summaries

California

QB Jeff Dankworth sat out the second quarter with a bruised hip; returned in the third

Alabama (Liberty Bowl)

1st quarter scoring: Alabama – Bucky Berrey 37-yard field goal; Alabama – Barry Krauss 44-yard interception return (Bucky Berrey kick); Alabama – Johnny Davis 2-yard run (Bucky Berrey kick)

2nd quarter scoring: Alabama – Jack O'Rear 20-yard pass from Tony Nathan (Bucky Berrey kick)

3rd quarter scoring: Alabama – Bucky Berrey 25-yard field goal
 
4th quarter scoring: Alabama – Bucky Berrey 28-yard field goal; UCLA – Jim Brown 61-yard run (Kick failed); Alabama – Rick Watson 1-yard run (2-point pass failed)

Awards and honors
 All-American: Jeff Dankworth (QB), Oscar Edwards (DB), Jerry Robinson (LB, consensus)

References

UCLA
UCLA Bruins football seasons
UCLA Bruins football
UCLA Bruins football